The "Fifth Circuit Four" (or simply "The Four") were four judges of the United States Court of Appeals for the Fifth Circuit who, during the late 1950s, became known for a series of decisions (which continued into the late 1960s) crucial in advancing the civil and political rights of African Americans; in this they were opposed by fellow Fifth Circuit judge Ben Cameron, a strong advocate of states' rights. At that time, the Fifth Circuit included not only Louisiana, Mississippi, and Texas (the limits of its jurisdiction since October 1, 1981), but also Alabama, Georgia, Florida, and the Panama Canal Zone. 

"The Four" were Chief Judge Elbert Tuttle and his three colleagues John Minor Wisdom, John Robert Brown, and Richard Rives. All but Rives were liberal Republicans; Rives was a Democrat and, according to Jack Bass, an intimate of Supreme Court justice Hugo Black.

Quote
"The Constitution is both color blind and color conscious. To avoid conflict with the equal protection clause, a classification that denies a benefit, causes harm, or imposes a burden must not be based on race. In that sense the Constitution is color blind. But the Constitution is color conscious to prevent discrimination being perpetuated and to undo the effects of past discrimination. The criterion is the relevancy of color to a legitimate government purpose."

 - Judge John Minor Wisdom, writing for the majority in United States v. Jefferson County Board of Education, 1966.

References
Jack Bass, "The 'Fifth Circuit Four'", The Nation, May 3, 2004, p. 30-32.
Jack Bass, Unlikely Heroes: The Dramatic Story of the Southern Judges of the Fifth Circuit who Translated the Supreme Court's Brown Decision Into a Revolution for Equality (New York: Simon and Schuster, 1981), .

See also
Frank Minis Johnson – a U.S. District Judge for the Middle District of Alabama whose rulings had a strong impact on civil rights in the American South

History of African-American civil rights
Judges of the United States Court of Appeals for the Fifth Circuit
Quartets